"Turning Away" is a song written by Tim Krekel, and recorded by American country music artist Crystal Gayle.  It was released in June 1984 as the third single from the album Cage the Songbird.  The song was Gayle's fourteenth number one single on the country chart.  The single went to number one for one week and spent a total of thirteen weeks on the country chart.

Charts

Weekly charts

Year-end charts

Shakin' Stevens version

Two years later, Welsh rockabilly singer Shakin' Stevens covered the song for his album Lipstick, Powder and Paint and peaked at number 15 on the UK Singles Chart.

Track listings
7": Epic /  A6819 (UK)

 "Turning Away" – 3:20
 "Diddle I" – 2:58

12": Epic / TA 6819 (UK)

 "Turning Away" (Extended Remix) – 4:25
 "Diddle I" – 2:58

Charts

References

1984 singles
Crystal Gayle songs
Song recordings produced by Jimmy Bowen
Warner Records singles
Songs written by Tim Krekel
1983 songs
1986 singles
Shakin' Stevens songs
1986 songs
Epic Records singles